Gonadotropin-releasing hormone receptor is a protein that in humans is encoded by the GNRHR gene.

This gene encodes the receptor for type 1 gonadotropin-releasing hormone. This receptor is a member of the seven-transmembrane, G-protein coupled receptor (GPCR) family. It is expressed on the surface of pituitary gonadotrope cells as well as lymphocytes, breast, ovary, and prostate. Following binding of gonadotropin-releasing hormone, the receptor associates with G-proteins that activate a phosphatidylinositol-calcium second messenger system. Activation of the receptor ultimately causes the release of gonadotropic luteinizing hormone (LH) and follicle stimulating hormone (FSH). Defects in this gene are a cause of hypogonadotropic hypogonadism (HH). Alternative splicing results in multiple transcript variants encoding different isoforms. More than 18 transcription initiation sites in the 5' region and multiple polyA signals in the 3' region have been identified for this gene.

See also
 Gonadotropin-releasing hormone receptor

References

Further reading

External links

G protein-coupled receptors
Gonadotropin-releasing hormone and gonadotropins